Donna Noble (later Donna Temple-Noble) is a fictional character in the long-running British science fiction television series Doctor Who. Portrayed by British actress and comedian Catherine Tate, she is a former companion of the Tenth Doctor (David Tennant). Originally appearing in the closing scene of the show's 2006 series and as a special guest star in its following Christmas special, "The Runaway Bride", Tate was not expected to reprise her role as Donna; for series 3 (2007), the Doctor travelled alongside medical student Martha Jones (Freema Agyeman). However, Tate expressed interest in returning to the role, and she returned as Donna for the duration of series 4 (2008), and in a subsequent 2009–2010 Christmas and New Year's special. On 15 May 2022, it was announced that Tate would reprise the role for the series' 60th anniversary special in 2023.

Within the series' narrative, Donna begins as an outspoken Londoner in her mid-30s, a temp worker from Chiswick whose view of the universe is small in scope. Although she at first finds alien time traveller the Doctor terrifying, their initial encounter leaves her unsatisfied with her normal life and she decides to travel alongside him when the next opportunity arises. Donna becomes an asset to the Doctor on his adventures and it is she who ultimately saves the universe in the series 4 finale, although tragically at the cost of the memories of her travels with the Doctor. In a contrast to the Tenth Doctor's prior companions, who both harboured romantic feelings for him, Donna and the Doctor shared a strictly platonic relationship; and she did not feel the need to prove herself to be allowed to travel with the Doctor, who refers to her as his "best friend".

Appearances

Television
Donna Noble makes her first appearance, credited as "The Bride", in the closing scenes of 2006 series finale "Doomsday"; she appears in a wedding dress, outraged to be inexplicably aboard the Doctor's TARDIS. The scene was kept a secret until broadcast, filmed with minimal crew, and was a humorous postscript to the sad farewell the Doctor shared with companion Rose (Billie Piper) moments prior. Donna's story is picked up in 2006 Christmas special "The Runaway Bride". Donna is a temporary secretary at HC Clements in London, a security firm which, unbeknownst to her, is a front organization for the alien-investigating Torchwood Institute. Her parents are Geoff (Howard Attfield) and Sylvia Noble (Jacqueline King). Donna discovers that she is a pawn in a scheme of the Empress (Sarah Parish) of the alien Racnoss, having been manipulated by her fiancé, Lance (Don Gilet). When the Doctor unleashes his fury upon the Racnoss, Donna snaps him out of it and together they escape before the Torchwood facility floods. Donna is upset, having lost her job and her fiancé, and declines the Doctor's offer to become his companion, though she advises he find one.  Donna does not appear in the 2007 series, but the character Wilfred Mott (Bernard Cribbins) appears in 2007 Christmas special "Voyage of the Damned"; in the 2008 series, he is introduced properly as Donna's grandfather, following the death of actor Howard Attfield.

In the series four opener "Partners in Crime" (2008), two years later, Donna has become dissatisfied with regular life and more interested in the bigger picture after her father died. When both are investigating the alien connection to Adipose Industries' Miss Foster (Sarah Lancashire), she and the Doctor are re-united, and she joins him in the TARDIS as a regular companion. In "The Fires of Pompeii", Donna shows her compassion when she argues and convinces the Doctor to save a family in Pompeii from the eruption of Mount Vesuvius. In "Planet of the Ood", Donna and the Doctor go to the Ood-Sphere and Donna defends the Ood from the abuses they suffer at the hands of humans.  In the two-parter "The Sontaran Stratagem" and "The Poison Sky", Donna meets the Doctor's former companion Martha Jones (Freema Agyeman) who works for UNIT and together they stop the Sontarans from using ATMOS to choke the world. In "The Doctor's Daughter", it is Donna who names the eponymous character "Jenny" (Georgia Tennant) and subsequently convinces the Doctor to accept Jenny. The Doctor and Donna meet Agatha Christie (Fenella Woolgar) in "The Unicorn and the Wasp" and have to solve their very own murder mystery with Agatha Christie and a giant alien wasp.

The two-parter episodes of "Silence in the Library" and "Forest of the Dead" introduces River Song (Alex Kingston) and the Doctor accidentally shoves Donna into a cyberworld while attempting to keep her safe from the Vashta Nerada. She then falls in love with Lee McAvoy and has two children with him. However, she discovers that the world she is in and her children are actually digital replications, the revelation severely traumatising her.  "Midnight" gives Donna a break with a spa day while the Doctor has the most terrifying bus ride of his life.  The episode  "Turn Left" features a parallel universe wherein Donna never met the Doctor; consequently, the Doctor died and the world comes to an end much sooner. In finale episodes "The Stolen Earth" and "Journey's End", Donna touches the Doctor's energised severed hand and is imbued with the totality of his knowledge, with which she is able to stop Davros (Julian Bleach) and his plan to destroy reality. However, because her mind cannot handle the knowledge, the Doctor is forced to wipe her memory of him against her wishes when she tries to beg him not to send her back the way she was. He hopes that they never meet again, lest she remember and her mind "burn up".

Donna reappears in the two-part "The End of Time" (2009–2010). Early in the story, she buys her grandfather a book written by the episode's villain, which the Doctor takes to mean that the "DoctorDonna" is still trying to subconsciously lend a hand. When every member of the human race (apart from herself and Wilfred, attributed to Wilfred being shielded and Donna's DNA still being slightly altered after the meta-crisis) becomes a clone of the Doctor's nemesis the Master (John Simm), Donna's memories are nearly restored; however, a fail-safe installed by the Doctor protects her, as Donna generates a brief telepathic pulse that knocks out herself and the Masters in the vicinity. In the story's concluding moments, Donna is last seen when she marries new fiancé Shaun Temple (Karl Collins), becoming Donna Temple-Noble; the dying Doctor anonymously delivers her a winning lottery ticket to ensure her financial future, having borrowed the purchase price from Donna's late father in the past, making it a present from both him and the Doctor.

Tate will reprise the role as an older Donna who is still married for the show’s 60th anniversary alongside the Fourteenth Doctor (also played by David Tennant). The special is expected to premiere in 2023.

Literature
Outside of the television series, Donna appears in some of the BBC Books New Series Adventures novels, alongside the Tenth Doctor, in stories set in-between episodes of series four. Donna first appears in Ghosts of India by Mark Morris, The Doctor Trap by Simon Messingham, and Shining Darkness by Mark Michalowski in September 2008. She makes a fourth and final appearance in the novels in Beautiful Chaos by Gary Russell in December 2008; subsequent Tenth Doctor novels in the New Series Adventures range feature the Doctor traveling alone. Donna also features in a number of Doctor Who short stories, in Doctor Who Annual 2009, and in The Doctor Who Storybook in 2007 and 2009, as well as making one online short story appearance "The Lonely Computer" (the events of which are briefly alluded to in the episode "The Unicorn and the Wasp").

The character also features prominently in comic books and comic strips featured in Doctor Who Magazine, the younger-audience Doctor Who Adventures, and Doctor Who: Battles in Time, online comic book features, comics featured in the Annual, and Storybook, as well as in two arcs of American comic book company IDW Publishing's Doctor Who ongoing series. In 2016, she would star in a fifth full book, called In the Blood, again with the Tenth Doctor, written by Jenny Colgan.

Audio drama
Donna appears in Big Finish Productions' fiftieth anniversary mini-series Destiny of the Doctor, appearing in the tenth story, Death's Deal, released in October 2013, with Tate returning to play the role.  The series was co-produced with AudioGO, who at the time held the license to produce audio productions based on the revived series.

Following the folding of AudioGO and Big Finish's acquisition of the new series license, Tate reprises the role once again in Doctor Who: The Tenth Doctor Adventures in May 2016, with David Tennant reprising the Tenth Doctor. The stories include Technophobia, Time Reaver and Death and the Queen. In 2019, Donna featured in the third volume of the Tenth Doctor Adventures alongside The Tenth Doctor (David Tennant), Wilfred Mott (Bernard Cribbins) and Sylvia Noble (Jacqueline King), with a story featuring the Judoon.

Donna also appears in three original audiobooks published by BBC Books: Pest Control (May 2008), The Forever Trap (October 2008) and The Nemonite Invasion (February 2009).

Casting
As indicated by David Tennant in his series two video diary (included in the DVD box set), the casting of Catherine Tate was kept secret; her scene in "Doomsday" was filmed with minimal crew. His series three video diary mentions that this instance was one of the few occasions where the element of surprise was successfully maintained without it being revealed in advance by the media. Tate became the first guest star to be named in the show's opening credits, which has since become common practice in the show's specials. Her character was considered by the production team to have companion status long before the announcement of the character's return.

Executive producer Russell T Davies at one time dismissed Donna's potential as an ongoing companion due to her abrasive personality, saying that "she'd get on your nerves". In fact, the character was not originally scheduled to return at all. Donna did not  appear in his original conception of reunion episode "The Stolen Earth", despite planned reappearances from Martha, Captain Jack (Barrowman), Sarah Jane (Sladen), Rose (Piper), Jackie Tyler (Camille Coduri), as well as Mickey Smith (Noel Clarke), Elton Pope from series 2 episode "Love & Monsters", and the cast of spin-off series Torchwood. Davies originally intended the series four companion to be "Penny", a Northern woman with whom the Doctor would share a romantic attraction. After a conversation between Catherine Tate and the BBC's Jane Tranter, in which Tate expressed an interest in returning, Davies rewrote season four to bring Donna back as the new full-time companion instead.

Tate looked to her own full-time casting as a "gamble" on the part of executive producer Russell T Davies; Tate attributes this to being "known, by the vast majority of people, for wearing wigs and comedy teeth" (in her sketch comedy The Catherine Tate Show). The actress was grateful to Davies for casting her, and joked about the prominence eventually afforded her character: " "For one brief moment I was the most important woman in the whole of the universe." Ben Rawson-Jones attributes success to the natural progression of her character, her boisterous personality being toned down for her first 2008 appearance, "Partners in Crime".

Reception

In their review of the fourth series, Digital Spy opined "At the core was Catherine Tate's excellent performance as Donna Noble, epitomising the intricate fusion of fun, adventure, sadness and a desire to belong." Digital Spy noted that fans initially worried about Tate's full-time casting, as she is known for her role as a comedian and comic actor. They attributed the character's success to the modification of the much more brash and boisterous character she appeared to be in "The Runaway Bride". The character's comedic elements continued ("the occasional... misfire") in the form of her tendency to shout, but Digital Spy was praising of many of the character's comedic moments. They praised more highly Tate's crying scenes in "The Fires of Pompeii", which "gave the visually impressive episode much-needed depth", as well as her sensitivity and emotionality at the mistreatment of the alien Ood in "Planet of the Ood". Cult Editor Ben Rawson-Jones also praised the character's "tragic" scenes, such as losing her fake children and ideal man in "Forest of the Dead", and the "emotional wringer" of Donna-centric episode "Turn Left".

Donna was voted the second best companion of all time in Doctor Who Magazine Issue 414 and Issue 474.

References

External links

 Donna Noble on the BBC's Doctor Who website

Television characters introduced in 2006
Doctor Who companions
British female characters in television
Fictional people from London
Fictional secretaries
Fictional people from the 21st-century